The Diocese of Adelaide, Archiocese of Adelaide, Bishop of Adelaide and Archbishop of Adelaide could refer to:
The Anglican Diocese of Adelaide, led by the Anglican Bishop of Adelaide (1847–1970)
The Anglican Archdiocese of Adelaide, led by the Anglican Archbishop of Adelaide (1970–present)
The Roman Catholic Diocese of Adelaide, led by the Roman Catholic Bishop of Adelaide (1843–1887)
The Roman Catholic Archdiocese of Adelaide, led by the Roman Catholic Archbishop of Adelaide (1887–present)